Alice Smith (born 1978) is an American singer and songwriter.

Alice Smith may also refer to:

Alice Mary Smith (1839–1884), English composer
Alice E. Smith, American engineer
Alice Emily Smith (1871–?), British chemist
Alice Kimball Smith (1907–2001), American historian, author and teacher
Alice Ravenel Huger Smith (1876–1958), often abbreviated as Alice Smith, American painter
Alice Smith, a character in the 1990 film Alice

See also
Alice Leigh-Smith (1907–1987), English nuclear physicist